Ross County Football Club are a Scottish professional association football club based in Dingwall. Ross County joined the Highland Football League in 1929, and then were one of two clubs voted into the Scottish Professional Football League System in 1994.

The club's record appearance maker is Michael Gardyne, who has made Over 400 appearances through four spells at the club. Gardyne is also the club's record goalscorer, scoring over 70 goals in major competitions during his time at Ross County.

This list encompasses the major honours won by Ross County, records set by the club, their managers and their players.  The player records section includes details of the club's leading goalscorers and those who have made most appearances in first-team competitions. It also records notable achievements by Ross County players on the international stage, and the highest transfer fees paid and received by the club. Attendance records are also included in the list.

Honours

League
 First Division/Championship (second tier)
 Winners (2): 2011–12, 2018–19
 Second Division (third tier)
 Winners (1): 2007–08
 Third Division (fourth tier)
 Winners (1): 1998–99
 Highland Football League
 Winners (3): 1966–67, 1990–91, 1991–92
 Runners-up (2): 1967–68, 1972–73
 North Caledonian Football League
 Winners (2): 1965–66, 1996–97

Cup
 Scottish Cup
 Runners-up (1): 2009–10
 Scottish League Cup:
 Winners (1): 2015–16
 Challenge Cup
 Winners (3): 2006–07, 2010–11, 2018–19
 Runners-up (2): 2004–05, 2008–09
 Qualifying Cup (North)
 Winners (1): 1993–94
 Runners-up (5): 1933–34, 1965–66, 1969–70, 1972–73, 1973–74
 North of Scotland Cup
 Winners (6): 1929–30, 1969–70, 1971–72, 1991–92, 2006–07, 2018–19
 Highland League Cup
Winners (4): 1949–50, 1968–69, 1978–79, 1991–92

Youth
 SPFL Development League (Under-20)
 Winners (1): 2016–17

Player records

Individual Records
 Most Appearance Holder: Michael Gardyne (444)
 Record Goalscorer: Michael Gardyne (73)
 Most Goals in a season (all competitions): Andrew Barrowman (29)
 Most Goals in a season (league): Andrew Barrowman (24)
Most Clean Sheets: Nicky Walker (54)
Most Hat-Tricks: Liam Boyce (5)

Most appearances
As of 27 May 2021

Source:

Top goalscorers
As of 27 May 2021

Source:

Clean Sheets
As of 12 February 2023

Source:

Club captains

Team of the Decade 
In January 2020 Ross County Twitter put out a poll to fans to decide on the team of the 2010s. The Results were as follows:

GK:  Scott Fox
DF:  Marcus Fraser
DF:  Andrew Davies
DF:  Scott Boyd
DF:  Evangelos Ikonomou
MF:  Richard Brittain
MF:  Jackson Irvine
MF:  Iain Vigurs
MF:  Michael Gardyne
FW:  Liam Boyce
FW:  Alex Schalk

Source:

International players 
This is a list of former and current players who have played at full international level while with the club and the year of their first International cap while at the club. 

 2001  Richard Hastings
 2006  Sean Webb
 2010  Michael McGovern
 2010  Atli Gregersen
 2013  André Hainault
 2014  Yoann Arquin
 2014  Filip Kiss
 2014  Erik Čikoš
 2015  Liam Boyce
 2015  Jackson Irvine
 2017  Tim Chow
 2018  Mattias Käit
 2021  Regan Charles-Cook
Most Caps while at Club: Liam Boyce, Atli Gregersen, Yoann Arquin, Richard Hastings (6)
Most International Goals while at Club: Liam Boyce (1)

Club records

 First league goal scored: William D Herd 1994 v Cowdenbeath
 Record all-time attendance: 8,000 approx v Rangers (Scottish Cup 28 February 1966)
 Record league attendance: 6,590 v Celtic (Scottish Premiership 18 November 2017)
 Record win: 11–0 v St Cuthbert Wanderers (1993–94 Scottish Cup first round)
Record League win 8-0 v Albion Rovers (15 August 1998)
 Record defeat: 0–7 v Kilmarnock (1961–62 Scottish Cup third round)
 Club record signing: £100,000 – Ross Draper from Inverness Caledonian Thistle, 9 August 2017
 Club record sale: £500,000 – Liam Boyce to Burton Albion, 20 June 2017

Managers
As of 24 May 2021

References

Records
Ross County